The atmosphere of the Moon is a very scant presence of gases surrounding the Moon. For most practical purposes, the Moon is considered to be surrounded by vacuum. The elevated presence of atomic and molecular particles in its vicinity compared to interplanetary medium, referred to as "lunar atmosphere" for scientific objectives, is negligible in comparison with the gaseous envelopes surrounding Earth and most planets of the Solar System. Otherwise, the Moon is considered not to have an atmosphere because it cannot absorb measurable quantities of radiation, does not appear layered or self-circulating, and requires constant replenishment due to the high rate at which its gases get lost into space.

Roger Joseph Boscovich was the first modern astronomer to argue for the lack of atmosphere around the Moon in his De lunae atmosphaera (1753).

Sources 
One source of the lunar atmosphere is outgassing: the release of gases such as radon and helium resulting from radioactive decay within the crust and mantle. Another important source is the bombardment of the lunar surface by micrometeorites, the solar wind, and sunlight, in a process known as sputtering.

Escape Velocity and atmospheric hold 
Gases can:
 be re-implanted into the regolith as a result of the Moon's gravity;
 be lost to space either by solar radiation pressure or, if the gases are ionized, by being swept away in the solar wind's magnetic field.

Composition 
What little atmosphere the Moon has consists of some unusual gases, including sodium and potassium, which are not found in the atmospheres of Earth, Mars, or Venus. At sea level on Earth, each cubic centimeter of the atmosphere contains approximately  molecules; by comparison the lunar atmosphere contains fewer than  molecules in the same volume. On Earth, this is considered to be a very good vacuum. In fact, the density of the atmosphere at the Moon's surface is comparable to the density of some of the outermost fringes of Earth's atmosphere, where the International Space Station orbits.

The elements sodium and potassium have been detected in the Moon's atmosphere using Earth-based spectroscopic methods, whereas the isotopes radon-222 and polonium-210 have been inferred from data obtained by the Lunar Prospector alpha particle spectrometer. Argon-40, helium-4, oxygen and/or methane, nitrogen and/or carbon monoxide, and carbon dioxide) were detected by in-situ detectors placed by the Apollo astronauts.

The average daytime abundances of the elements known to be present in the lunar atmosphere, in atoms per cubic centimeter, are as follows:
Argon: 20,000–100,000
Helium: 5,000–30,000
Neon: up to 20,000
Sodium: 70
Potassium: 17
Hydrogen: fewer than 17

This yields approximately 80,000 total atoms per cubic centimeter, marginally higher than the quantity posited to exist in the atmosphere of Mercury. While this greatly exceeds the density of the solar wind, which is usually on the order of just a few protons per cubic centimeter, it is virtually a vacuum in comparison with the atmosphere of the Earth.

The Moon may also have a tenuous "atmosphere" of electrostatically levitated dust. See Lunar soil for more details.

Ancient atmosphere
In October 2017, NASA scientists at the  Marshall Space Flight Center and the Lunar and Planetary Institute in Houston announced their finding, based on studies of Moon magma samples retrieved by the Apollo missions, that the Moon had once possessed a relatively thick atmosphere for a period of 70 million years between 3 and 4 billion years ago.  This atmosphere, sourced from gases ejected from lunar volcanic eruptions, was twice the thickness of that of present-day Mars.  It has been theorized, in fact, that this ancient atmosphere could have supported life, though no evidence of life has been found. The ancient lunar atmosphere was eventually stripped away by solar winds and dissipated into space.

See also 

 Atmosphere of Mercury
 Exosphere
 Lunar Atmosphere and Dust Environment Explorer (LADEE)
 Orders of magnitude (pressure)
 Sodium tail of the Moon

References 

Lunar science
Moon
Moon